The Estádio Municipal Coronel José Bezerra, nicknamed Bezerrão, is a football stadium located in Currais Novos, Rio Grande do Norte state, Brazil. It is currently used mostly for football games and is the home stadium of Associação Cultural e Desportiva Potyguar Seridoense. The stadium holds 2,000 people, and was built in 1967. The stadium is owned by the Currais Novos City Hall.

History
The stadium was inaugurated on June 24, 1967. Estádio Municipal Coronel José Bezerra hosted Potyguar de Currais Novos games in the 2010 Copa do Brasil.

References

Coronel Bezerra
Buildings and structures completed in 1967
Sports venues in Rio Grande do Norte